Carenum affine is a species of ground beetle in the subfamily Scaritinae. It was described by William John Macleay in 1864.

References

affine
Beetles described in 1864